Gandhi Nagar is a neighbourhood in Adyar, in the south eastern part of the Indian city of Chennai. It is bordered by the Adyar River, Kasturba Nagar, Kotturpuram, Indira Nagar and the Buckingham canal. Today Gandhi Nagar is a commercial hot spot having relatively good transport and other facilities.

History

Gandhi Nagar has more than 150 years of history. The oldest landmarks in Gandhi Nagar are the Pillaiyar Kovil and the St. Patrick's School. It was established as 'Gandhi Gram' in January 1948, just a week before Mahatma Gandhi was assassinated. Gandhi Nagar is one of the earliest planned layouts in the erstwhile Madras with more than 322 housing plots, underground drainage systems and broad roads. The neighborhood began its transformation towards becoming a residential locality around 1949 when the first residents are believed to have moved in.

Gandhi Nagar Society

First transport
The first residential (non academic) inhabitants are people from a tiny town called Sadhuranga pattinam (சதுரங்கப்பட்டினம்) or Sadras as it is called. They came from Chengulpet to Gandhi Nagar via Buckingham canal via boats that was propelled by wind under favorable conditions or the boats were pulled by humans with rope from boat tied to their waist. At that time in 1942, Gandhi Nagar had lush paddy fields and was used for agriculture and was bordered by Guindy forest (which has almost disappeared now).

First families

The Alwaris family is said to be the first family who resided in Gandhi Nagar. 

The next was the family of Mudaliar Brothers. The Mudaliar Brothers consisted of Mr. S.K. Ramachandra Mudaliar and Mr. S.K.Puniyakoti Mudaliar. They worked in Triplicane, but bought vast lands in Gandhi Nagar as their building construction flourished. In one of their lands stands the old cancer institute, which was donated by Mr. S.K. Puniyakoti Mudaliar. Mr. Puniyakoti Mudaliar built first independent flats in Gandhi Nagar. The Mudaliar brothers construction industry recruited people from Sathurangapattinam (Sadras), the first workers settled on banks of Adyar River, this settlement was later called Malligai Poo Nagar.

Dr.A.Ramachandran was another personality who was one among the few who chose to purchase a house in 1954 and reside in Gandhi Nagar. He was a famous Veterinary Doctor and Surgeon who was often visited by people from all walks of life including Politicians, Film Personalities of yesteryear's and normal people alike. He was serving the Government & was assigned specific tasks to enhance care of the wild and mammals.

Malligai Poo Nagar (மல்லிகை பூ நகர்)

The Mudaliar Brothers (S.K.Ramachandra Mudaliar and S.K.Puniyakoti Mudaliar) were building contractors. They needed manpower to execute their projects. Hence people (primarily from Sathurangapattinam) were bought in. They settled on the banks of Adyar river. The laborer settlement attracted more people, thus a community was formed and was named Malligai Poo Nagar which means jasmine flower settlement.

Gandhi Nagar Library

Modern Gandhi Nagar
Gandhi Nagar today is a hot spot in the city, having many businesses and hotels.

Business
 Kolam Serviced Apartments, 51, 2nd Main Road, Gandhi Nagar
 MAVY Physiotherapy Group, 2nd Main Road, Gandhi Nagar, Adyar
 The Grand Sweets and Snacks - Located on 2nd Main Road is 'the' star attraction of Gandhi Nagar. Although these days, the traffic congestion caused by this and other business are adding to the nuisance value.
 Sri Krishna Sweets
 Sri Lakshmi Systems - Computerised Astrological Services - 49, 2nd Main Road, Gandhi Nagar
 Spencer's Daily
 Sangeetha's Desi Destination - Vegetarian Restaurant
 Odyssey - Books and gifts
 Nuts and Spices
 Cup and Saucer
 Kaya Skin Clinic
 Basics - Men's wear showroom
 Naihaa
 Kumarakom - Kerala cuisine restaurant
 Munveedu - Restaurant 
 Ravi's Executive Parlour - Men's stylist & hairdresser
 Adyar Ananda Bhavan
 McDonald's -Located near naihaa first main road
 Bata - Footwear sales
 Universal - Gadget sales
 JFA -Furniture store
 Ramonds - Apparel 
 @home - Home products . Located near Spencers daily at first main road.
 Code interesteR - Coding school

Temples & Religious Institutions
 Sri Anantha Padmanabhaswami Temple
 St. Louis Church
 Sundara Vinayagar Temple
 Mookambikai Amman temple
 Durgai amman temple
 Shirdi Sai Baba temple

Famous people
 Alwaris family
 S.K.Ramachandra Mudaliar
 S.K.Puniyakoti Mudaliar
 MK Thiagaraja Bagavathar
 Adv R Thiagarajan
 Adv Vasudha Thiagarajan
 MG Ramachandran
 Kalki Krishnamurthy 
 Dr. Padma Subrahmanyam
 Anandha Vikatan S.Balasubramaniyan
 Dr.A.Ramachandran 
 Komal Anbarasan
Adv Arcot Vishnuvardhana Mudaliar 
 Justice AR. Lakshmanan
 Justice Jagadhesan
 Justice Veerasamy
 Justice Ramaswamy
 Adithanar family
 Advocate R. Gandhi
 Musician T Mukta
 The Chandoks
 DIG Srikanth

Schools
 St Patrick's
 St Michael's Academy
 Kumararrajah Muthiah Higher Secondary School
 Kumari Rani Meena Muthiah College of Arts and Science
 Kumari Rani Meena Muthiah Matriculation Higher Secondary School
 Rani Meiyammai
 Bala Vidya Mandir Senior Secondary School
 St. Mark's School
Sri sankara

References

Neighbourhoods in Chennai